Eldorado Pass (el. 4623 ft.) is a mountain pass in Oregon traversed by U.S. Route 26.

References 

Mountain passes of Oregon
Transportation in Malheur County, Oregon
Landforms of Malheur County, Oregon
U.S. Route 26